Labarthe is a commune in the Tarn-et-Garonne department in the Occitanie region in southern France.

Geography

The town is located along the Upper Quercy bordering with the department of Lot on Lupte and Lemboulas.

The productions are very varied and include livestock, vineyards, orchards, market gardens, and organic crops. The terrain consists of hilly woods, and the farmland provides a wide variety of landscapes.

See also
 Communes of the Tarn-et-Garonne department

References

Communes of Tarn-et-Garonne